Dialytes is a genus of aphodiine dung beetles in the family Scarabaeidae. There are about five described species in Dialytes.

Species
These five species belong to the genus Dialytes:
 Dialytes criddlei Brown, 1929
 Dialytes striatulus (Say, 1825)
 Dialytes truncatus (Melsheimer, 1845)
 Dialytes ulkei Horn, 1875
 Dialytes umbratus Balthasar, 1941

References

Further reading

 
 
 
 

Scarabaeidae
Articles created by Qbugbot